Fairlane Village Mall is a shopping mall located just outside of Pottsville, Pennsylvania off Route 61.  It is anchored by Boscov's, Dunham's Sports, Kohl's, and Michaels.

History
Development of the mall was delayed by earth moving operations and the discovery of coal. Fairlane Village was built on property owned by the Seitzinger Brothers, with its name coming from the Ford Fairlane car. The mall opened with anchors Boscov's, McCrory, and Woolco. Gee Bee opened at the mall in 1983 and was later replaced by Value City in 1993.

Boscov's outside tent collapsed due to inclement weather in July 1986, with only light injuries occurring. In 1995, the Boscov's store was heavily reconstructed. A Lowe's Home Improvement store opened outside the mall on June 28, 1998. ERE Yarmouth Retail began running the mall that year. The Claverton Corp. sold the mall to Equity Investment Group in 2000. EigFairlane Village Mall LLC sold Fairlane Village Mall to A.M. Fairlane Village LLC in 2004. Levin Management took over running of the mall in 2006. Value City's closure was announced in February 2008, postponed in March, but later the store would finally close in November. Waldenbooks announced in late 2009 its store would be closing when it ran out of items, which it did in January 2010. The mall's movie theater (2 screens), after a series of owners including Carmike Cinemas, has been empty since 2010.

Dragon Chasers Emporium, a shop in the mall, was raided by police and searched for illegal drugs and associated items in February 2012. Kohl's replaced the former Value City in March 2012 after a massive renovation, but did not occupy all of its space or have a mall entrance. Michaels opened in August 2012 next to Kohl's. Fashion Bug closed in 2012, along with the rest of the chain. Village Pretzel closed in December 2012 due to the owner's retirement and poor sales.

Fairlane Village LLC settled a multi-year tax valuation dispute with local townships in 2013. Roman Delight restaurant closed nine months before its lease expired due to economic reasons in 2014. Puppy Luv moved from the mall in late 2015 to Pottsville, and changed its name to Fish and Beyond Pet Center. CVS moved from the mall in April 2016 to a new location in Pottsville. The Hallmark Heritage Shop began its closing sale in May 2016.

Fairlane Village Mall was sold in September/October 2016 for $12,875,000 to Pottsville Commons LLC and Pottsville Mall LLC. Wells Fargo closed in April 2017, merged with another closing branch, and opened a new location at the Pottsville Park Plaza. rue21 also closed at the mall in 2017. Benigna's Creek Wine Shoppe and Gertrude Hawk Chocolates opened in 2017, after previously being located at the former Schuylkill Mall. Littman Jewelers closed in January 2018. Dunham's Sports opened at the mall in December 2018 after also previously being located at the former Schuylkill Mall.

Lexington Realty International took over management of the mall on May 1, 2019. Fairlane Village Mall lost one restaurant and three stores in 2020, two of which closed during the malls COVID-19 pandemic shutdown. The mall's ex-Schuylkill Valley Sports served as a COVID-19 vaccination site starting in February 2021. TJ Maxx will open at the mall in 2022, using most of the malls one wing expect for the ex-movie theater.

See also
List of shopping malls in Pennsylvania
Schuylkill Mall
Cressona Mall

References

External links
 Official website

Shopping malls in Pennsylvania
Shopping malls established in 1974
1974 establishments in Pennsylvania
Buildings and structures in Schuylkill County, Pennsylvania
Tourist attractions in Schuylkill County, Pennsylvania